The 1994 British Grand Prix was a Formula One motor race held at Silverstone on 10 July 1994. It was the eighth race of the 1994 Formula One World Championship.

The 60-lap race was won from pole position by local driver Damon Hill, driving a Williams-Renault. Drivers' Championship leader, German Michael Schumacher, crossed the line second in his Benetton-Ford, but was subsequently disqualified for overtaking Hill on the formation lap and failing to serve a stop-go penalty in time; he was also given a two-race ban. Frenchman Jean Alesi was thus classified second in his Ferrari, with Finn Mika Häkkinen third in a McLaren-Peugeot.

Report

Pre-race 
Going into this race, Benetton's Michael Schumacher led the Drivers' Championship with 66 points out of a possible 70. Williams' Damon Hill was second on 29 points, followed by Ferrari drivers Gerhard Berger and Jean Alesi on 17 and 13 respectively. Benetton led the Constructors' Championship with 67 points, followed by Ferrari on 36 and Williams on 31.

Following his appearance at the previous round in France, Nigel Mansell had returned to his CART commitments in America, so David Coulthard returned in the second Williams to partner Hill.

Qualifying 
Qualifying was extremely close with Hill, Schumacher and Berger in competition for pole position. Berger collided with the barrier at the end of the pitlane as he attempted to have another lap. Hill took pole position with a time of 1:24.960. Schumacher took second position on the grid, three thousandths of a second slower than Hill and Berger third, two hundredths of a second behind Hill.

Race 
On the formation lap, Schumacher overtook Hill twice (once when leaving the dummy grid, and then once more further round the lap), before dropping back to take his second place on the grid for the start.

David Coulthard stalled on the grid at the start, forcing him to start from the back of the grid – he fought back to finish 5th. This prompted another formation lap, on which Eddie Irvine's car broke down. Again on this second formation lap, Schumacher overtook Hill twice. The Peugeot V10 engine in Martin Brundle's McLaren MP4/9 failed on the second start in a cloud of smoke.

On lap 14, Michael Schumacher was handed a five-second stop-go penalty for overtaking Hill on the first formation lap. He failed to serve the penalty by lap 21, and as a result was shown the black flag twice, requiring him to stop immediately at the pits. Schumacher did not acknowledge the black flag, and later claimed that he had not seen it. Benetton told the race officials that there had been a misunderstanding over the 5-second stop-go penalty, and after discussing the issue with the team the officials withdrew the black flag and Schumacher finally served the stop-go penalty at the end of lap 27.

Mika Häkkinen and Rubens Barrichello collided while battling for 4th place at the final corner. Barrichello pulled his damaged car into the pits, without realising that he was on the final lap. This allowed Häkkinen to limp over the finish line before Barrichello reached it, despite his car being more severely damaged.

Behind them, Ukyo Katayama scored what proved to be his final point.

Post-race 
The stewards fined Benetton $25,000 and gave the team and their driver Michael Schumacher a severe reprimand for ignoring Schumacher's five-second stop-go penalty and the subsequent black flag. On 26 July, the FIA World Motorsport Council increased the penalty to a $500,000 fine for the team and a two race ban for Schumacher. The WMSC also disqualified Schumacher from his second place at the British Grand Prix.  The penalty was upheld on appeal on 30 August.

Classification

Qualifying

Race

Championship standings after the race

Drivers' Championship standings

Constructors' Championship standings

References

British Grand Prix
British Grand Prix
Grand Prix
British Grand Prix